Heacham Football Club is a football club based in Heacham, England. They are currently members of the Eastern Counties League Division One North and play at Station Road, Heacham.

History
Heacham were formed in 1907. In 2022, following a seventh consecutive promotion, the club was admitted into the Eastern Counties League Division One North.

Ground
The club currently play at Station Road, Heacham.

References

Heacham
Association football clubs established in 1907
1907 establishments in England
Football clubs in England
Football clubs in Norfolk
Anglian Combination
Eastern Counties Football League